Ian Sinfield (3 October 1934 – 12 March 2010) was an Australian long-distance runner. He competed in the marathon at the 1960 Summer Olympics.

References

1934 births
2010 deaths
Athletes (track and field) at the 1960 Summer Olympics
Australian male long-distance runners
Australian male marathon runners
Olympic athletes of Australia
Athletes from London